Greece competed at the 2017 World Championships in Athletics in London, United Kingdom, from 4–13 August 2017. A team of 21 athletes, 9 men and 12 women, represented the country in a total of 18 events.

Medalists

Results
Key
Q = Qualified for the next round
q = Qualified for the next round as a fastest loser or, in field events, by position without achieving the qualifying target
NR = National record
PB = Personal best
SB = Season best
NM = No mark
N/A = Round not applicable for the event

Men
Track and road events

Field events

Women 
Track and road events

Field events

Sources 
Official website
Official IAAF competition website
Greek team 

Nations at the 2017 World Championships in Athletics
World Championships in Athletics
Greece at the World Championships in Athletics